Jason Leach is an American football safety.

High school career
Leach prepped at Bishop Amat High School in La Puente, California.

College career
Leach played college football at the University of Southern California.  He started in 2003 and 2004.

Professional Football Career
Leach played for the National Football League San Diego Chargers in 2005.

1982 births
Living people
People from Chino, California
USC Trojans football players
San Diego Chargers players
Sportspeople from San Bernardino County, California
American football safeties
Players of American football from California